Wilbur Louis Schu (December 18, 1922 – November 6, 1980) was an American professional basketball player. He played for the Youngstown Bears and Tri-Cities Blackhawks in the National Basketball League during the 1946–47 season. He averaged 1.4 points per game.

Schu played both football and basketball at the University of Kentucky.

References

1922 births
1980 deaths
American men's basketball players
Basketball players from Louisville, Kentucky
Forwards (basketball)
Guards (basketball)
Kentucky Wildcats football players
Kentucky Wildcats men's basketball players
Tri-Cities Blackhawks players
Youngstown Bears players